Jacobs is a patronymic medieval surname. Its origin is from the given name Jacob, derived from the Latin Jacobus, itself derived from the Hebrew language personal name Yaakov, from the Hebrew word akev ("heel"). It is common in English speaking countries and German speaking countries. There are many variant spellings. The first record of the surname is in 1244 in the "Cartularium Monasterii de Rameseia".
Jacobs is also an ancient Anglo-Saxon surname that came from the baptismal name Jacob. The surname Jacobs referred to the son of Jacob which belongs to the category of patronymic surnames. 
People with the surname Jacobs include:

A
A. J. Jacobs (born 1968), American journalist and author
AJ Jacobs (rugby union) (born 1985), South African rugby referee
Aad Jacobs (born 1936), Dutch businessman
Abe Jacobs (born 1938), New Zealand professional wrestler
Adolph Jacobs (1939–2014), American guitar player
Adrian Jacobs (born 1980), South African rugby player
Alan Jacobs (disambiguation), several people, including:
Alan Jacobs (academic) (born 1958), American writer and professor
Alan Jacobs (filmmaker), American film director and screenwriter
Aletta Jacobs (1854–1929), Dutch physician, feminist and pacifist
Alfred Jacobs (1897–1976), Australian activist for civil liberties and Aboriginal rights
Allan Jacobs (born 1928), American urban designer, planner and writer
Allen Jacobs American football player
Alma Smith Jacobs (1916–1997), American librarian
Ananda Jacobs (born 1983), American actress, singer, model, producer and composer
Andreas Jacobs (born 1963), German businessman
Andrew Jacobs (disambiguation), several people, including:
Andrew Jacobs (journalist), reporter for The New York Times and documentary film director and producer
Andrew Jacobs (lawyer) (1906–1992), lawyer, judge, and Congressman for one term, in Indiana
Andrew Jacobs, Jr. (1932–2013), lawyer, Indiana state legislator, and Congressman
Andy Jacobs (born 1952), British sports radio personality
Anja Jacobs (born 1974), German film director
Anthony Jacobs, Baron Jacobs (born 1931), British businessman and politician
Ariël Jacobs (born 1953), Belgian football player and manager
Arnold Jacobs (1915–1998), American orchestral tuba player
Arnold Jacobs (cricketer) (1892–1974), Argentine cricketer
Art Jacobs (1902–1967), American baseball pitcher
Arthur Jacobs (disambiguation), several people, including:
Arthur Jacobs (1922–1996), English musicologist
Arthur Jacobs, New Zealand cricketer known as Bert Jacobs (cricketer) 
Arthur I. Jacobs (1858–1918), American drill-chuck innovator
Arthur P. Jacobs (1922–1973), American film producer

B
Bárbara Jacobs (born 1947), Mexican writer
Ben Jacobs (disambiguation), several people, including:
Ben Jacobs (American football) (born 1988), American football player
Ben Jacobs (Australian rules footballer) (born 1992), Australian rules footballer
 Ben Jacobs (journalist), U.S. journalist
Ben Jacobs (rugby union) (born 1982), Australian rugby player
Benjamin Jacobs (dentist) (1919–2004), Polish Jew, Auschwitz survivor
Benjamin R. Jacobs (1879–1963), American biochemist
Bert Jacobs (1941–1999), Dutch football player and manager
Beverley Jacobs (born 1965), Canadian First Nation lawyer and activist
Bobby Jacobs (born 1965), Dutch bassist and composer for the prog-rock group Focus
Brad Jacobs (curler) (born 1985), Canadian curler
Brandon Jacobs (born 1982), American football player
Brian Jacobs (born 1995), Dutch footballer
Brian Jacobs (actor), American actor
Bruce Jacobs (disambiguation), several people, including:
Bruce Jacobs (radio host) (born 1964), American talk radio host
Bruce Jacobs (field hockey) (born 1975), South African field hockey player
J. Bruce Jacobs (1943–2019), American-born Australian academic

C
C. Scott Jacobs, American communication theorist
Cameron Jacobs (born 1989), South African rugby player
Carrie Jacobs-Bond (1862–1946), American singer, pianist, and songwriter 
Charles Jacobs (disambiguation), several people, including:
Charles Fenno Jacobs (1904–1974), American photographer
Charles Jacobs (political activist), with American Anti-Slavery Group
Charlotte Jacobs (1847–1916), Dutch feminist and pharmacist
Chris Jacobs (disambiguation), several people, including:
Chris Jacobs (actor), American co-host of Discovery Channel television show Overhaulin''' 
Chris Jacobs (swimmer) (born 1964), American swimmer
Christian Jacobs (born 1972), American musician, television producer, voice actor and former child actor
Christianne Meneses Jacobs (born 1971), Nicaraguan American writer, editor, and teacher
Christopher Jacobs (politician) (born 1967), American politician
Clare Jacobs (1886–1971), American pole vaulter

D
Daniel Jacobs (disambiguation), several people, including:
Dan Jacobs (trumpeter) (born 1942), American jazz trumpeter
Dan Jacobs (born 1982), American metal guitarist with the band Atreyu
Danie Jacobs (1904–1999), South African Olympic athlete
Daniel Jacobs (boxer) (born 1987), American professional boxer
Danny Jacobs (actor) (born 1968), American voice actor
Danny Jacobs (footballer) (born 1980), Australian rules footballer
Dave Jacobs (born 1957), American football player
David Jacobs (disambiguation), several people, including:
David Jacobs (broadcaster) (1926–2013), BBC radio and television presenter and actor
David Jacobs (cricketer, born 1989), South African cricketer
David Jacobs (gymnast), American gymnast
David Jacobs (Ontario politician), Canadian lawyer and politician
David Jacobs (sociologist), American sociologist
David Jacobs (steroid dealer) ( 1973–2008), American personal trainer
David Jacobs (table tennis) (born 1977), Indonesian table tennis player
David Jacobs (Welsh athlete) (1888–1976), Welsh sprinter
David Jacobs (writer) (born 1939), American creator/writer of the television series Dallas and Knots LandingDavid Anthony Jacobs, Baron Jacobs (1931–2014), British businessman and Liberal Democrat politician
David M. Jacobs (born 1942), American UFO and abduction phenomenon researcher
Davy Jacobs (born 1982), South African cricketer
Debbie Jacobs (born 1955), American disco singer
Dennis Jacobs (born 1944), American judge
Denny Jacobs (born 1937), American politician
Dolly Jacobs (born 1957), American circus aerialist

E
Edgar P. Jacobs (1904–1987), Belgian comic book writer and artist
Édouard Jacobs (1851–1925), Belgian cellist
Elizabeth Jacobs (anthropologist) (1903–1983), American anthropologist
Elsy Jacobs (1933–1988), Luxembourgian road bicycle racer
Elmer F. Jacobs (born 1945), American architect
Ethel D. Jacobs (1910–2001), American racehorse owner/breeder
Eva E. Jacobs (died 2015), American statistician

F
Ferdinand Jacobs ( 1713–1783), English Hudson's Bay Company officer
Ferne Jacobs (born 1942), an American fiber artist 
Ferris Jacobs, Jr. (1836–1886), American (New York) politician and Union Army general
Francis Jacobs (born 1939), British jurist
Franklin Jacobs (born 1957), an American high jumper
Christian Friedrich Wilhelm Jacobs known as Friedrich Jacobs (1764–1847), German classical scholar

G
Garry Jacobs (born 1946), American sociologist
Gary Jacobs (disambiguation), several people, including:
Gary Jacobs (boxer) (born 1965), Scottish boxer
Gary Jacobs (solicitor) (c. 1946–2002), British lawyer
Gary Jacobs (writer) (born 1952), American television comedy writer and producer
Gary E. Jacobs (born 1962), American businessman and philanthropist
George Jacobs (disambiguation), several people, including:
George Jacobs, Sr. ( 1620–1692), hanged for witchcraft in Salem witch trials
George Jacobs (inventor) (1877–1945), American inventor
George Jacobs (basketball) known as "Doc" Jacobs (died 1968), American basketball coach
Georges Jacobs (born 1940), Belgian businessman
Gerald Jacobs, British author
Gillian Jacobs (born 1982), American actress
Glenn Jacobs (born 1967), American professional wrestler known as "Kane"
Graeme Jacobs (born 1944), Australian rules footballer

H
Hannah Jacobs, British illustrator and animator
Hans Jacobs (1907–1994), German sailplane designer and pioneer
Harold Jacobs (disambiguation), several people, including:
Harold M. Jacobs (1912–1995), Jewish and civic leader in New York
Harold R. Jacobs (born 1939), American author and teacher of mathematics 
Harriet Jacobs (1813–1897), African-American writer and abolitionist
Harry Jacobs (disambiguation), several people, including:
Harry Jacobs (American football) (born 1937), American football player
Harry Jacobs (Australian footballer) (1913–2000), Australian rules footballer
Harry Jacobs (conductor) (1888–1988), Australia musician
Harry Jacobs (tug of war) (fl. 1904), American tug of war athlete
Harry Allan Jacobs (1872–1932), American architect
Heidi Hayes Jacobs (born 1948), American educator and businesswoman
Helen Jacobs (1908–1997), American tennis player ranked world #1
Helene Jacobs (1906–1993), German Resistance member
Henry Jacobs (disambiguation), several people, including:
Henry Jacobs (1924–2015), American humorist
Henry Jacobs (priest) (1824–1901), first Dean of Christchurch, New Zealand
Henry Jacobs (1924–2015), American sound artist and humorist
Henry Barton Jacobs (1858–1939), American physician
Henry Eyster Jacobs (1844–1911), American religious figure and writer
Herbert Jacobs, (1903–1987), American journalist and inventor of method of crowd measurement
Hirsch Jacobs (1904–1970), American horse trainer
Howard Jacobs, American sports lawyer

I
Irwin M. Jacobs (born 1933), American co-founder of Qualcomm
Israel Jacobs (1726–1796), colonial Pennsylvania politician

J
Jack Jacobs (disambiguation), several people, including:
Jack Jacobs (1919–1974), American and Canadian football player
Jack Jacobs (cricketer) (1909–2003), New Zealand cricketer
Jack B. Jacobs, Delaware judge
Jack H. Jacobs (born 1945),American Medal of Honor recipient
Jaco Jacobs (born 1980), South African children's book author
Jacob Jacobs (disambiguation), several people, including:
Jacob Jacobs (painter) (1812–1879), Belgian painter
Jacob Jacobs (theater) (1890–1977), Yiddish theater and vaudeville director, producer, etc.
James Jacobs (disambiguation), several people, including:
James Jacobs (game designer), American game designer
James B. Jacobs (born 1947), American law professor
Jamie Jacobs, second individual to assume identity of American western hero Phantom Rider
Jamie Jacobs (footballer) (born 1997), Dutch (soccer) football player
Jane Jacobs (disambiguation), several people, including:
Jane Jacobs (1916–2006), American-Canadian urbanist
Jane Jacobs (baseball) (1924–2015),  All-American Girls Professional Baseball League player
Jane M. Jacobs (born 1958), Australian geographer
Janet Jacobs (born 1928), All-American Girls Professional Baseball League player
Janice L. Jacobs (born 1946), American Foreign Service Officer 
Jay Jacobs (disambiguation), several people, including:
Jay Jacobs (broadcaster) (born 1938), American sports announcer
Jay Jacobs (businessman) (1911–2013), American founder of Jay Jacobs clothing retailer
Jay Jacobs (politician) (born 1953), American politician
Jay Jacobs (athletic director) (born  1964), American athletic director
Jean-Charles Jacobs (1821–1907), Belgian physician and entomologist
Jerry Jacobs (disambiguation), multiple people
Jill Jacobs (born 1951), American educator and wife of Vice President Joe Biden
Jill Jacobs (rabbi) (born 1975), American Conservative rabbi
Jim Jacobs (born 1942), American composer, lyricist, and writer
Jim Jacobs (customizer), American hot rodder and customizer
Jimmy Jacobs (born 1984), American professional wrestler
Jimmy Jacobs (handballer) (1930–1988), American handball player and boxing manager
Joan Jacobs Brumberg (born 1944), American social historian
Jochem Jacobs (born 1977), Dutch guitarist, producer and recording engineer
Joe Jacobs (American football) (born 1970), American Arena Football league player
Joe Jacobs (actor) (born 1983), English actor
Joe Jacobs (speedway rider) (born 1993), British speedway rider
Joey Jacobs (born 1960), British boxer
Joey Jacobs Sr. (born 1937), British boxer
John Jacobs (disambiguation), several people, including:
John Jacobs (activist) (1947–1997), SDS member and "weatherman"
John Jacobs (American golfer) (born 1945), American golfer
John Jacobs (English golfer) (1925–2017), English golfer
John Jacobs (evangelist) (born 1959), American evangelist and bodybuilder
John Jacobs (producer), American film and television producer
John Jacobs (student leader) (1947–1997), American student and anti-war activist
John C. Jacobs (1838–1894), New York politician
John E. Jacobs (1903–1971), American educator
John Henry Jacobs (1847–1934), American sandstone industrialist
John Hornor Jacobs (born 1971), American author
Johnny Jacobs (1916–1982), American television announcer
Jon Jacobs (actor) (born 1966), British actor and entrepreneur
Jos Jacobs (born 1953), Belgian road bicycle racer
Josef Jacobs (1894–1978), German pilot
Joseph Jacobs (disambiguation), several people, including:
Joseph Jacobs (1854–1916), Australian-born folklorist, literary critic and historian
Joseph J. Jacobs (1916–2004), American engineer and businessman
Josh Jacobs (born 1998), American football player
Julian Jacobs (born 1937), American judge
Julian Jacobs (basketball) (born 1994), American basketball player
June Jacobs, British Jewish peace activist

K
Kate Jacobs (born 1959), American singer-songwriter
Katie Jacobs Stanton (born 1969), American businesswoman, head of international strategy at Twitter
Keaghan Jacobs (born 1989), South African footballer
Ken Jacobs (born 1933), American experimental filmmaker
Kenneth Jacobs (disambiguation), several people, including:
Kenneth Jacobs (1917–2015), Australian judge
Kenneth M. Jacobs (born  1958), American businessman, CEO of Lazard
Klaus Johann Jacobs (1936–2008), German-born Swiss billionaire
Kristin Jacobs (1959-2020), American politician
Kyle Jacobs (disambiguation), several people

L
 Lamont Marcell Jacobs, (Born 1994) Italian 100m Olympic Champion
L. Rowley Jacobs, (c.1823–1890s), itinerant American portrait painter
Laura Jacobs, American novelist, journalist, and dance critic
Laura Ann Jacobs, (born 1960) American sculptor and mixed media artist
Lawrence Jacobs (born 1955), American executive and lawyer with News Corporation
Leighshe Jacobs (born 1985), South African cricketer
Leon Jacobs (born 1995), American football player
Lesedi Sheya Jacobs (born 1997), Namibian tennis player
Lewis Jacobs (1904–1997), American author, director and publisher
Lionel M. Jacobs ( 1842–1922), American businessman and politician
Lodewijk Jacobs (born 1951), Dutch sprint canoer
Lohan Jacobs (born 1991), South African rugby player
Lou Jacobs (1903–1992), American circus clown 
Lou Jacobs (footballer) (1884–1936), Australian rules footballer
Louis Jacobs (disambiguation), several people, including:
Louis Jacobs (1920–2006), British Orthodox rabbi
Louis L. Jacobs (born 1948), American vertebrate paleontologist

M
Manis Jacobs (1782–1839), Dutch-born rabbi in New Orleans 
Marc Jacobs (born 1963), American fashion designer
Marcell Jacobs (born 1994), Italian athlete
Margaret Jacobs (artist) (born 1963), Native American artist
Margaret D. Jacobs (born 1963), American historian
Marie-Josée Jacobs (born 1950), politician from Luxembourg
Marion Walter Jacobs (Little Walter''') (1930–1968), American blues harmonica player
Mark Jacobs (disambiguation), several people, including:
Mark Jacobs (author) (born 1951), American writer and diplomat
Mark Jacobs (video game designer), American video game executive
Mary C. Jacobs (1828–1909), American horticulturalist and writer
Mary Frick Garrett Jacobs (1851–1936), American socialite, philanthropist, and art collector
Matthew Jacobs (born 1956), British actor and writer for TV
Matthew Jacobs (rugby union) (born 1985), English-born rugby player
Maxwell Ralph Jacobs (1905–1979), Australian forester
Melanie B. Jacobs, American legal scholar and administrator
Michael Jacobs (disambiguation), several people, including:
Michael Jacobs (art and travel writer) (born 1952), travel and arts writer
Michael Jacobs (producer) (born 1955), American producer and playwright
Michael Jacobs (footballer) (born 1991), English footballer
Michael J. Jacobs (born 1952), English photojournalist
Mike Jacobs (disambiguation), several people, including:
Mike Jacobs (shortstop) (1877–1949), American baseball player
Mike Jacobs (boxing) (1880–1953), American boxing promoter
Mike Jacobs (Illinois politician) (born 1960), American (Illinois) politician
Mike Jacobs (Georgia politician) (born  1976), American (Georgia) politician
Mike Jacobs (first baseman) (born 1980), American baseball player

N
Nancy Jacobs (born 1951), American (Maryland) politician
Nat Jacobs (born 1939), English boxer
Noel Jacobs (1898–1977), English commander in the Shanghai Volunteer Corps
Norman Jacobs (born 1947), British author

O
Olu Jacobs (born 1942), Nigerian actor
Onno Jacobs (born 1964), Dutch businessman associated with FC Feyenoord 
Oral Jacobs (1911-1995), American politician
Orange Jacobs (1827–1914), American lawyer, newspaper publisher, and politician
Otto Jacobs (1889–1955), American baseball catcher

P
Parker Jacobs (born 1975), American musician and graphic designer
Patricia Jacobs (born 1934), British geneticist
Patti Ruffner Jacobs (1875–1935), American suffragist
Paul Jacobs (disambiguation), several people, including:
Paul Jacobs (ice hockey) (1894–1973), Canadian First Nation hockey player
Paul Jacobs (activist) (1918–1978), American activist
Paul Jacobs (Flemish writer) (born 1949), Flemish author
Paul Jacobs (organist) (born 1977), American organist
Paul Jacobs (pianist) (1930–1983), American pianist
Paul E. Jacobs (born 1962), American Chief Executive Officer of Qualcomm
Paul Emil Jacobs (1802–1866), German painter
Paul Jacobs (composer) (born 1950), American composer and musician
Pete Jacobs (disambiguation), several people, including:
Pete Jacobs (musician) (1899–c.1952), American jazz drummer
Pete Jacobs (triathlete) (born 1981), Australian triathlete
Peter Jacobs (disambiguation), several people, including:
Peter Jacobs (fencer) (born 1938), British Olympic fencer
Peter Jacobs (lacrosse) (born 1973), American lacrosse player
Petrus Jacobs (1910–1967), South African military commander
Pieter Jacobs (born 1986), Belgian road bicycle racer
Pim Jacobs (1934–1996), Dutch jazz pianist and television presenter

Q
Quinton Jacobs (born 1979), Namibian footballer

R
Regina Jacobs (born 1963), American middle distance runner
René Jacobs (born 1946), Belgian conductor and countertenor
Sir Roland Ellis Jacobs (1891–1981), South Australian businessman
Rich Jacobs (born 1972), American artist
Richard Jacobs (disambiguation), several people, including:
Richard Jacobs (businessman) (1925–2009), American businessman
Richard Jacobs (rabbi) (born 1956), American Reform rabbi 
Rick Jacobs, founder and chair of the Courage Campaign
Ridley Jacobs (born 1967), Antiguan cricketer
Rob Jacobs (born 1943), Dutch football player and manager
Robert Nelson Jacobs (born 1954), American screenwriter
Rodger Jacobs (born 1959), American writer
Ron Jacobs (disambiguation), several people, including:
Ron Jacobs (rugby union) (1928–2002), English rugby player
Ron Jacobs (broadcaster) (1937–2016), American broadcaster
Ron Jacobs (basketball) (1942–2015), American basketball coach
Rusty Jacobs (born 1967), American film actor

S
Sam Jacobs (bishop) (born 1938), American Roman Catholic bishop
Sam Jacobs (footballer) (born 1988), Australian rules footballer
Sam Jacobs (judge) (1920–2011), Justice of the Supreme Court of South Australia
S. J. Jacobs, Samuel Joshua Jacobs (1853–1937), South Australian businessman
Samuel Jacobs (disambiguation), several people, including:
Samuel William Jacobs (1871–1938), Canadian lawyer and politician
Sheek Louch (born Sean Divine Jacobs 1976), American rapper
Sherelle Jacobs, British journalist
Silveria Jacobs (born 1968), Prime Minister of Sint Maarten
Simeon Jacobs (1839–1885), South African judge
Simmone Jacobs (born 1966), British sprinter
Solomon Jacobs (1861–1920), English rabbi
Steve Jacobs (born 1967), Australian actor
Steven Jacobs (disambiguation), several people, including:
Steven Jacobs (television presenter) (born 1967), Australian television presenter and actor
Steven Jacobs (footballer) (born 1987), Belgian footballer
Steven L. Jacobs (born 1947), American historian
Stu Jacobs (born 1965), New Zealand footballer
Susan S. Jacobs (born  1945), American diplomat and children's rights activist

T
Tanja Jacobs, Canadian actor and director
Thomas Jacobs (disambiguation), several people, including:
Thomas M. Jacobs (1926–2014), American Nordic skier
Thornwell Jacobs (1877–1956), American educator, author, and Presbyterian minister.
Tim Jacobs (born 1952), Canadian ice hockey player
Tommy Jacobs (born 1935), American golfer 
Tramain Jacobs (born 1992), American football player
Trevor Jacobs (born 1946), English footballer

U

V

W
W. W. Jacobs (1863–1943), English author
Walter Jacobs (1930–1968), American blues harmonica player
Walter Abraham Jacobs (1883–1967), American chemist
Wayne Jacobs (born 1969), English footballer and football coach
Werner Jacobs (1909–1999), German film director
Wil Jacobs (born 1960), Dutch handball player
Wilfred Jacobs (1919–1995), Governor-General of Antigua and Barbuda
William Jacobs (disambiguation), several people, including:
William H. Jacobs (1831–1882), German-born American legislator and banker

X

Y
 Yehudah Jacobs (c. 1940–2020), American rabbi and mashgiach ruchani in Beth Medrash Govoha

Z
 Zina Jacobs (1821–1901), American Mormon pioneer

See also
Justice Jacobs (disambiguation)

References

Dutch-language surnames
English-language surnames
Patronymic surnames
Surnames from given names